G protein-coupled receptor 35 also known as GPR35 is a G protein-coupled receptor which in humans is encoded by the GPR35 gene. Heightened expression of GPR35 is found in immune and gastrointestinal tissues, including the crypts of Lieberkühn.

Ligands

Endogenous ligands 

Although GPR35 is still considered an orphan receptor, there have been attempts to deorphanize it by identifying endogenous molecules that can activate the receptor. All of the currently proposed ligands are either unselective towards GPR35, or they lack high potency, a characteristic feature of natural ligands. The following list includes the most prominent examples:

 kynurenic acid
 LPA species
 cyclic guanosine monophosphate
 DHICA
 T3
 reverse T3

Synthetic agonists 

Other synthetic agonists of GPR35 include:
 cromoglicic acid
 nedocromil
 pamoic acid
 zaprinast
 lodoxamide
 bufrolin

Zaprinast is currently the gold standard in the biochemical evaluation of novel synthetic GPR35 agonists, because it remains potent in an animal model. Most other known agonists display high selectivity towards the human GPR35 orthologue. This phenomenon is well established for other GPCRs and complicates the development of pharmaceutical drugs.

Antagonists 

Antagonists of GPR35 include:
 ML145 (CID-2286812)
 ML144 (CID-1542103)

Both ML145 and ML144 unfurl their antagonistic activity through inverse agonism. They are, however, highly species-selective, and practically inactive at the rodent receptor orthologues.

Clinical significance 

Deletion of GPR35 gene may be responsible for brachydactyly mental retardation syndrome and is mutated in 2q37 monosomy and 2q37 deletion syndrome. In one study GPR35 has been recognised as a potential oncogene in stomach cancer.

References 

G protein-coupled receptors